Válur is a village on the Faroese island of Streymoy located in Kvívík Municipality. Its population is 49 (2015). Its postal code is FO 358.

See also
 List of towns in the Faroe Islands

Populated places in the Faroe Islands